Zechlin is both a geographical and a family name in Germany.

Notable people
 Dieter Zechlin (1926–2012), German pianist and professor 
 Ruth Zechlin (1926–2007), German composer

Zechlin as a geographical name 

 Three suburbs of the town of Rheinsberg, Brandenburg (north of Berlin)
 Dorf Zechlin 
 Flecken Zechlin
 Zechlinerhütte (summer residence of the geoscientist Alfred Wegener, the "father of" continental drift)
 German name of a town in Pomerania (Poland): see Żychlin.